Night & Day is the third studio album released by British pop rock band The Vamps, initially released as the Night Edition on 14 July 2017. Cited as a concept album by the band, Night & Day was released in two parts, with the Day Edition following on 13 July 2018.

The Night Edition album was preceded by the release of the singles "All Night" and "Middle of the Night", and includes collaborations with Matoma, Martin Jensen, Mike Perry, Sabrina Carpenter and Joe Don Rooney. The album debuted at number one on the UK Albums Chart, making it the band's first number-one album.

On 13 July 2018, they released the second part of the album titled Night & Day (Day Edition). It debuted at number one on the Official Scottish Albums Chart and number two on the UK Albums Chart.

Formats
On 3 May 2017, the band posted a video on their social media accounts detailing several formats of the Night Edition which were made available for pre-order from 5 May. The released versions include:
 standard digital edition which contains eight tracks
 deluxe digital edition which contains ten tracks plus videos from the Wake Up World Tour: Live at the O2 Arena live DVD
 "Brad Edition", which contains ten tracks plus a DVD of the Wake Up world tour and a poster of Brad
 "James Edition", which contains two exclusive tracks and a poster of James
 "Connor Edition", which contains two exclusive tracks and a poster of Connor
 "Tristan Edition", which contains two exclusive tracks and a poster of Tristan
 collector's bundle which contains all four versions of the album, all signed by each individual band member, plus a pre-sale code for the band's Night and Day Showcase tour
 vinyl version of the album which was released on 15 August 2017

The Day Edition was released on the same formats but with three exclusive tracks for each member instead of two.

Tour

Night Edition
To support the album, the band undertook two tours. The first, the Middle of the Night Tour, took place in arenas across the United Kingdom and Ireland between April and May 2017. During the first show on 28 April, the album's title and release date of 14 July 2017 was officially confirmed. During the tour, the band performed "Hands", "Paper Hearts", "Shades On" and "Middle of the Night" live for the first time, as well as premiering a previously unreleased song, "Time is Not on Our Side", set to be released on the Day Edition. A second tour, known as the Night and Day Showcase, took place throughout the first two weeks of July, preceding the album's release. During the show, the band performed all ten songs from the standard edition of the album. Then, the Middle of the Night Tour visited South America, Oceania, Asia and Mexico between May and September 2017. During the show, the band performed most of the songs from the original setlist, with some changes like "Same to You" and "Sad Song" being added to the setlist, "It's a Lie" was also performed in Brazil and Argentina with Tini.

Day Edition
The band also took two tours to promote the album. The first, the Night & Day Tour, also took place in arenas across the United Kingdom and Ireland between April and May 2018. The band did a European tour between May and June 2018. During the tour, the band performed "Just My Type" and "Hair Too Long" live for the first time. Maggie Lindemann was a special guest during the UK leg where she performed "Personal" and "Pretty Girl" with the band. There was also a couple summer show that took place between July and September 2018 in Europe. The second part of the tour will start on 13 September 2018 in Mexico, then going through United States, then to South Korea, finishing in Buenos Aires, Argentina on 17 November 2018.

The second tour, the Four Corners Tour will go start on 27 April 2019 and end on 1 June. Their support acts are the British band New Hope Club and singer HRVY

Singles

Night Edition
 "All Night", a collaboration with the Norwegian DJ Matoma, was released as the first single from the night edition on 14 October 2016. It peaked at number 24 on the UK Singles Chart and was certified gold in the country.
 "Middle of the Night", a collaboration with Danish DJ Martin Jensen, was released as the second single from the night edition on 28 April 2017. The song debuted at number 44 on the UK Singles Chart.
 "Hands", a collaboration with DJ Mike Perry and Sabrina Carpenter, was released as a single on 19 May 2017.

Day Edition
 "Staying Up", a second collaboration with Matoma, was originally released as the lead single on 31 August 2017. Despite being at #80 on the UK Singles Chart, "Staying Up" was later removed from the final tracklisting of the album.
 "Personal", a duet with singer-songwriter Maggie Lindemann, was released as the official lead single from the album on 13 October 2017. It peaked at #76 on UK Singles Chart.
 "Too Good to Be True", a collaboration with Danny Avila featuring Machine Gun Kelly, was released as the second single from the album on 2 March 2018.
 "Hair Too Long" was released as the third single from the album on 20 April 2018.
 "Just My Type" was released as the fourth single from the album on 15 June 2018.

Track listing

Night Edition

Day Edition

Notes
  Signifies a co-producer
  Signifies an additional producer
  Not included on the digital version
  Separated into different tracks on the digital version

Charts

Night Edition (2017)

Day Edition (2018)

Year-end charts

Certifications

References

2017 albums
The Vamps (British band) albums
2018 albums
Concept albums